Below is the list of populated places in Giresun Province, Turkey by the districts. In the following lists first place in each list is the administrative center of the district.

Giresun

 Giresun
 Akçalı, Giresun
 Akıncı, Giresun
 Akköy, Giresun
 Alınca, Giresun
 Anbaralan, Giresun
 Barça, Giresun
 Barçaçakırlı, Giresun
 Bayazıt, Giresun
 Boztekke, Giresun
 Burhaniye, Giresun
 Camili, Giresun
 Çağlayan, Giresun
 Çaldağ, Giresun
 Çalış, Giresun
 Çamlık, Giresun
 Çandır, Giresun
 Çavuşoğlu, Giresun
 Çiçekli, Giresun
 Çukurköy, Giresun
 Darıköy, Giresun
 Duroğlu, Giresun
 Ergence, Giresun
 Eriklimanı, Giresun
 Esentepe, Giresun
 Evrenköy, Giresun
 Güney, Giresun
 Gürköy, Giresun
 Güveç, Giresun
 Hamidiye, Giresun
 Hisargeriş, Giresun
 İncegeriş, Giresun
 İnişdibi, Giresun
 Karaali, Giresun
 Kemaliye, Giresun
 Lapa, Giresun
 Mesudiye, Giresun
 Okçu, Giresun
 Orhaniye, Giresun
 Ortaköy, Giresun
 Pınarçukuru, Giresun
 Sarvan, Giresun
 Sayca, Giresun
 Seyitköy, Giresun
 Sıvacı, Giresun
 Uzgur, Giresun
 Uzkara, Giresun
 Ülper, Giresun
 Yağmurca, Giresun
 Yaykınlık, Giresun
 Yazlık, Giresun
 Yenicehisar, Giresun
 Yukarıalınlı, Giresun

Alucra

 Alucra
 Akçiçek, Alucra
 Aktepe, Alucra
 Arda, Alucra
 Arduç, Alucra
 Armutlu, Alucra
 Aydınyayla, Alucra
 Bereketli, Alucra
 Beylerce, Alucra
 Boyluca, Alucra
 Fevzi Çakmak, Alucra
 Çakrak, Alucra
 Çalgan, Alucra
 Çamlıyayla, Alucra
 Demirözü, Alucra
 Dereçiftlik, Alucra
 Doludere, Alucra
 Elmacık, Alucra
 Gökçebel, Alucra
 Günügüzel, Alucra
 Gürbulak, Alucra
 Hacıhasan, Alucra
 Hacılı, Alucra
 İğdecik, Alucra
 Kabaktepe, Alucra
 Kaledibi, Alucra
 Kamışlı, Alucra
 Karabörk, Alucra
 Kavaklıdere, Alucra
 Koman, Alucra
 Konaklı, Alucra
 Köklüce, Alucra
 Pirili, Alucra
 Subaşı, Alucra
 Suyurdu, Alucra
 Tepeköy, Alucra
 Tohumluk, Alucra
 Yeşilyurt, Alucra
 Yükselen, Alucra

Bulancak

 Bulancak
 Ahmetli, Bulancak
 Ahurlu, Bulancak
 Alibey, Bulancak
 Ardahan, Bulancak
 Arifli, Bulancak
 Ataköy, Bulancak
 Aydındere, Bulancak
 Bahçeli, Bulancak
 Bayındır, Bulancak
 Bostanlı, Bulancak
 Burunucu, Bulancak
 Büyükada, Bulancak
 Cindi, Bulancak
 Damudere, Bulancak
 Demircili, Bulancak
 Döngeri, Bulancak
 Duttepe, Bulancak
 Elmalı, Bulancak
 Erdoğan, Bulancak
 Eriklik, Bulancak
 Esenköy, Bulancak
 Ezeltere, Bulancak
 Gültepe, Bulancak
 Gündoğdu, Bulancak
 Güneyköy, Bulancak
 Güzelyurt, Bulancak
 Hacet, Bulancak
 Hisarkaya, Bulancak
 İcilli, Bulancak
 İnece, Bulancak
 Karaağaç, Bulancak
 Karacaresul, Bulancak
 Kayabaşı, Bulancak
 Kayadibi, Bulancak
 Kayhan, Bulancak
 Kışla, Bulancak
 Kovanlık, Bulancak
 Kuşluhan, Bulancak
 Kuzköy, Bulancak
 Küçükada, Bulancak
 Küçükdere, Bulancak
 Küçüklü, Bulancak
 Muratlı, Bulancak
 Odadüzü, Bulancak
 Pazarsuyu, Bulancak
 Samugüney, Bulancak
 Süme, Bulancak
 Şeyhmusa, Bulancak
 Talipli, Bulancak
 Tandır, Bulancak
 Tekmezar, Bulancak
 Tepecik, Bulancak
 Tepeören, Bulancak
 Tokmadin, Bulancak
 Torçan, Bulancak
 Yalıköy, Bulancak
 Yaslıbahçe, Bulancak
 Yeniköy, Bulancak
 Yeşilhisar, Bulancak
 Yeşilköy, Bulancak
 Yeşiltepe, Bulancak
 Yıldız, Bulancak
 Yunuslu, Bulancak

Çamoluk

 Çamoluk
 Akyapı, Çamoluk
 Bayır, Çamoluk
 Çakılkaya, Çamoluk
 Daldibi, Çamoluk
 Eğnir, Çamoluk
 Fındıklı, Çamoluk
 Gücer, Çamoluk
 Gürçalı, Çamoluk
 Hacıahmetoğlu, Çamoluk
 Hacıören, Çamoluk
 Kaledere, Çamoluk
 Karadikmen, Çamoluk
 Kayacık, Çamoluk
 Kaynar, Çamoluk
 Kılıçtutan, Çamoluk
 Koçak, Çamoluk
 Kutluca, Çamoluk
 Okçaören, Çamoluk
 Ozan, Çamoluk
 Pınarlı, Çamoluk
 Sarpkaya, Çamoluk
 Taşcılar, Çamoluk
 Taşdemir, Çamoluk
 Usluca, Çamoluk
 Yenice, Çamoluk
 Yeniköy, Çamoluk
 Yusufeli, Çamoluk

Çanakçı

 Çanakçı
 Akköy, Çanakçı
 Bakımlı, Çanakçı
 Çağlayan, Çanakçı
 Deregözü, Çanakçı
 Doğanköy, Çanakçı
 Düzköy, Çanakçı
 Egeköy, Çanakçı
 Erenköy, Çanakçı
 Kahraman, Çanakçı
 Kaledibi, Çanakçı
 Karabörk, Çanakçı
 Kuşköy, Çanakçı
 Sarayköy, Çanakçı
 Yeşilköy, Çanakçı

Dereli

 Dereli
 Akkaya, Dereli
 Aksu, Dereli
 Alancık, Dereli
 Çalca, Dereli
 Çalköy, Dereli
 Çamlı, Dereli
 Çengelköy, Dereli
 Eğrianbar, Dereli
 Güdül, Dereli
 Güzelköy, Dereli
 Güzyurdu, Dereli
 Heydere, Dereli
 Hisarköy, Dereli
 İçmesu, Dereli
 Kızıltaş, Dereli
 Konuklu, Dereli
 Kurtulmuş, Dereli
 Küçükahmet, Dereli
 Küknarlı, Dereli
 Kümbet, Dereli
 Maden, Dereli
 Meşeliyatak, Dereli
 Pınarlar, Dereli
 Sarıyakup, Dereli
 Tamdere, Dereli
 Taşlıca, Dereli
 Tepeköy, Dereli
 Tepeküknarlı, Dereli
 Uzundere, Dereli
 Yavuzkemal, Dereli
 Yaylacık, Dereli
 Yeşilkaya, Dereli
 Yeşiltepe, Dereli
 Yeşilvadi, Dereli
 Yıldız, Dereli
 Yuva, Dereli
 Yüce, Dereli

Doğankent

 Doğankent
 Çatak, Doğankent
 Çatalağaç, Doğankent
 Doymuş, Doğankent
 Güdül, Doğankent
 Güvenlik, Doğankent
 Kozköy, Doğankent
 Oyraca, Doğankent
 Söğütağzı, Doğankent
 Yeniköy, Doğankent

Espiye

 Espiye
 Akkaya, Espiye
 Aralıcak, Espiye
 Arıdurak, Espiye
 Arpacık, Espiye
 Avluca, Espiye
 Bahçecik, Espiye
 Bayrambey, Espiye
 Çalkaya, Espiye
 Çepniköy, Espiye
 Demircili, Espiye
 Direkbükü, Espiye
 Ericek, Espiye
 Gebelli, Espiye
 Gülburnu, Espiye
 Gümüşdere, Espiye
 Güney, Espiye
 Güzelyurt, Espiye
 Hacıköy, Espiye
 Hacımahmutlu, Espiye
 İbrahimşeyh, Espiye
 Kaşdibi, Espiye
 Kurugeriş, Espiye
 Seydiköy, Espiye
 Soğukpınar, Espiye
 Şahinyuva, Espiye
 Taflancık, Espiye
 Tikence, Espiye
 Yeniköy, Espiye
 Yeşilköy, Espiye
 Yeşilyurt, Espiye

Eynesil

 Eynesil
 Adaköy, Eynesil
 Aralık, Eynesil
 Balcılı, Eynesil
 Belen, Eynesil
 Çorapçılar, Eynesil
 Dereköy, Eynesil
 İshaklı, Eynesil
 Kekiktepe, Eynesil
 Kemaliye, Eynesil
 Kemerli, Eynesil
 Kösemen, Eynesil
 Ören, Eynesil
 Yarımca, Eynesil

Görele

 Görele
 Akharman, Görele
 Aralıkoz, Görele
 Ardıç, Görele
 Ataköy, Görele
 Aydınlar, Görele
 Bayazıt, Görele
 Beşirli, Görele
 Boğalı, Görele
 Çatak, Görele
 Çatakkırı, Görele
 Çavuşlu, Görele
 Çiftlikköy, Görele
 Dayılı, Görele
 Dedeli, Görele
 Dereboyu, Görele
 Derekuşçulu, Görele
 Dikmen, Görele
 Esenli, Görele
 Esenyurt, Görele
 Eserli, Görele
 Gölbaşı, Görele
 Gülpınar, Görele
 Gültepe, Görele
 Güneyköy, Görele
 Güvendik, Görele
 Haydarlı, Görele
 İnanca, Görele
 İsmailbeyli, Görele
 Karaburun, Görele
 Karadere, Görele
 Kırıklı, Görele
 Koyunhamza, Görele
 Köprübaşı, Görele
 Köprübaşı, Görele
 Kuşçulu, Görele
 Maksutlu, Görele
 Menteşe, Görele
 Ortaköy, Görele
 Recepli, Görele
 Sağlık, Görele
 Seferli, Görele
 Soğukpınar, Görele
 Şahinyuva, Görele
 Şalaklı, Görele
 Şenlik, Görele
 Tekgöz, Görele
 Tepeköy, Görele
 Terziali, Görele
 Türkelli, Görele
 Yalıköy, Görele
 Yeğenli, Görele
 Yeşildere, Görele

Güce

 Güce
 Akpınar, Güce
 Boncukçukur, Güce
 Dayıcık, Güce
 Düzçukur, Güce
 Fındıklı, Güce
 Fırınlı, Güce
 Gürağaç, Güce
 İlit, Güce
 Kuluncak, Güce
 Sarıyar, Güce
 Soğukpınar, Güce
 Örnekköy, Güce
 Ergenekon, Güce
 Tekkeköy, Güce
 Yukarıboynuyoğun, Güce

Keşap

 Keşap
 Alataş, Keşap
 Altınpınar, Keşap
 Armutdüzü, Keşap
 Arnavut, Keşap
 Balıklısu, Keşap
 Bayrambey, Keşap
 Bayramşah, Keşap
 Ceylanpınar, Keşap
 Çakırlı, Keşap
 Çamlıca, Keşap
 Değirmenağzı, Keşap
 Demirci, Keşap
 Dokuztepe, Keşap
 Düzköy, Keşap
 Erköy, Keşap
 Geçit, Keşap
 Gönüllü, Keşap
 Güneyköy, Keşap
 Gürpınar, Keşap
 Halkalı, Keşap
 Harmandarlı, Keşap
 Hisarüstü, Keşap
 Karabulduk, Keşap
 Karadere, Keşap
 Karaishak, Keşap
 Karakoç, Keşap
 Kaşaltı, Keşap
 Kayabaşı, Keşap
 Kılıçlı, Keşap
 Kirazlı, Keşap
 Kurbanpınarı, Keşap
 Küçükgeriş, Keşap
 Sancaklıtepe, Keşap
 Saraycık, Keşap
 Sayca, Keşap
 Sürmenli, Keşap
 Taflancık, Keşap
 Tepeköy, Keşap
 Töngel, Keşap
 Yazlık, Keşap
 Yivdincik, Keşap
 Yolağzı, Keşap
 Yolbaşı, Keşap
 Yünlüce, Keşap

Piraziz

 Piraziz
 Akçay, Piraziz
 Alidede, Piraziz
 Armutçukuru, Piraziz
 Balçıklı, Piraziz
 Bozat, Piraziz
 Bülbüllü, Piraziz
 Çağlandere, Piraziz
 Çayırköy, Piraziz
 Esentepe, Piraziz
 Gökçeali, Piraziz
 Güneyköy, Piraziz
 Hasanşeyh, Piraziz
 Kılıçlı, Piraziz
 Narlık, Piraziz
 Örnekköy, Piraziz
 Piraziz, Piraziz
 Şerefli, Piraziz
 Tepeköy, Piraziz
 Yunusemre, Piraziz

Şebinkarahisar

 Şebinkarahisar
 Ahurcuk, Şebinkarahisar
 Akviran, Şebinkarahisar
 Alişar, Şebinkarahisar
 Altınçevre, Şebinkarahisar
 Altınova, Şebinkarahisar
 Arslanşah, Şebinkarahisar
 Asarcık, Şebinkarahisar
 Bayhasan, Şebinkarahisar
 Bayramköy, Şebinkarahisar
 Buzkeçi, Şebinkarahisar
 Çağlayan, Şebinkarahisar
 Çakır, Şebinkarahisar
 Çamlıbel, Şebinkarahisar
 Dereköy, Şebinkarahisar
 Diler, Şebinkarahisar
 Doğanyuva, Şebinkarahisar
 Dönençay, Şebinkarahisar
 Duman, Şebinkarahisar
 Ekecek, Şebinkarahisar
 Erentepe, Şebinkarahisar
 Esentepe, Şebinkarahisar
 Evcili, Şebinkarahisar
 Gökçetaş, Şebinkarahisar
 Güneygören, Şebinkarahisar
 Gürpınar, Şebinkarahisar
 Güvercinlik, Şebinkarahisar
 Güzelyurt, Şebinkarahisar
 Hacıömer, Şebinkarahisar
 Hasanşeyh, Şebinkarahisar
 Hocaoğlu, Şebinkarahisar
 Karaağaç, Şebinkarahisar
 Karacaören, Şebinkarahisar
 Kayalı, Şebinkarahisar
 Kınık, Şebinkarahisar
 Konak, Şebinkarahisar
 Ocaktaşı, Şebinkarahisar
 Ovacık, Şebinkarahisar
 Ozanlı, Şebinkarahisar
 Örencik, Şebinkarahisar
 Saraycık, Şebinkarahisar
 Sarıyer, Şebinkarahisar
 Sipahi, Şebinkarahisar
 Suboyu, Şebinkarahisar
 Sultankonağı, Şebinkarahisar
 Şahinler, Şebinkarahisar
 Şaplıca, Şebinkarahisar
 Taşcılı, Şebinkarahisar
 Tekkaya, Şebinkarahisar
 Tepeltepe, Şebinkarahisar
 Tokluağıl, Şebinkarahisar
 Toplukonak, Şebinkarahisar
 Tönük, Şebinkarahisar
 Turpçu, Şebinkarahisar
 Uğurca, Şebinkarahisar
 Yakınca, Şebinkarahisar
 Yaycı, Şebinkarahisar
 Yedikardeş, Şebinkarahisar
 Yeniyol, Şebinkarahisar
 Yeşilyayla, Şebinkarahisar
 Yeşilyurt, Şebinkarahisar
 Yıltarıç, Şebinkarahisar
 Yumurcaktaş, Şebinkarahisar

Tirebolu

 Tirebolu
 Akıncılar, Tirebolu
 Arageriş, Tirebolu
 Arslancık, Tirebolu
 Aşağıboynuyoğun, Tirebolu
 Ataköy, Tirebolu
 Avcılı, Tirebolu
 Balçıkbelen, Tirebolu
 Belen, Tirebolu
 Civil, Tirebolu
 Çamlıköy, Tirebolu
 Çeğel, Tirebolu
 Danışman, Tirebolu
 Doğancı, Tirebolu
 Dokuzkonak, Tirebolu
 Düzköy, Tirebolu
 Ede, Tirebolu
 Eymür, Tirebolu
 Fatih, Tirebolu
 Hacıhüseyin, Tirebolu
 Halaçlı, Tirebolu
 Harkköy, Tirebolu
 Işıklı, Tirebolu
 İğnece, Tirebolu
 Karaahmetli, Tirebolu
 Karademir, Tirebolu
 Kayalar, Tirebolu
 Ketençukur, Tirebolu
 Kovancık, Tirebolu
 Kovanpınar, Tirebolu
 Köseler, Tirebolu
 Kuskunlu, Tirebolu
 Kuzgun, Tirebolu
 Menderes, Tirebolu
 Mursal, Tirebolu
 Ortacami, Tirebolu
 Ortaköy, Tirebolu
 Örenkaya, Tirebolu
 Özlü, Tirebolu
 Sekü, Tirebolu
 Sultanköy, Tirebolu
 Şenyuva, Tirebolu
 Şirin, Tirebolu
 Yağlıkuyumcu, Tirebolu
 Yalç, Tirebolu
 Yalıköy, Tirebolu
 Yaraş, Tirebolu
 Yeşilpınar, Tirebolu
 Yılgın, Tirebolu
 Yukarıboğalı, Tirebolu
 Yukarıortacami, Tirebolu

Yağlıdere

 Yağlıdere
 Akdarı, Yağlıdere
 Akköy, Yağlıdere
 Akpınar, Yağlıdere
 Dereköy, Yağlıdere
 Derindere, Yağlıdere
 Elmabelen, Yağlıdere
 Güllüce, Yağlıdere
 Hisarcık, Yağlıdere
 Kanlıca, Yağlıdere
 Koçlu, Yağlıdere
 Küçükköy, Yağlıdere
 Ortaköy, Yağlıdere
 Oruçbey, Yağlıdere
 Ömerli, Yağlıdere
 Sınırköy, Yağlıdere
 Sinanlı, Yağlıdere
 Tekkeköy, Yağlıdere
 Tuğlacık, Yağlıdere
 Üçtepe, Yağlıdere
 Ümütbükü, Yağlıdere
 Yazlık, Yağlıdere
 Yeniakköy, Yağlıdere
 Yenice, Yağlıdere
 Yeniyazlık, Yağlıdere
 Yeşilpınar, Yağlıdere
 Yeşilyurt, Yağlıdere

References

Giresun Province
List